Usman Oyibe Jibrin,   (born 16 September 1959) is a Nigerian navy vice admiral and the 21st Chief of Naval Staff.
Prior to his appointment as the Chief of Naval Staff he was the Chief of Logistics and Director of Training, Defence Headquarters Abuja.

Early life
Admiral Jibril was born on 16 September 1959 in Okura Olafia, a town in Dekina Local Government Area of Kogi State, Nigeria.
He attended the Nigerian Defence Academy as a member of the 24th Regular Combatant Course where he graduated as the Best Naval Cadet officer and was commissioned as Sub lieutenant of the Nigerian Navy on 1 January 1982.

Naval career
He began his naval career as a watch keeping officer on board NNS Damisa and NNS Aradu immediately after he was commissioned as Sub lieutenant. He served in this capacity for 2 years (January 1982 – January 1984). He later served as base intelligence officer, NNS UMALOKUN for approximately 3 years (July 1984 – 1987)
He also served as a flag lieutenant to the Chief of Defence Intelligence Agency and to the commandant officer of the Nigerian Navy Intelligence School,  Apapa, Lagos State, Nigeria, before he became an instructor at Navigation and Direction School, Nigerian Navy Ship Quorra. He served in that capacity for 2 years (1989–1991).
In 1994, he was appointed as a directing staff at the Armed Forces Command and Staff College Jaji, a tenure that elapsed in 1996 and after his tenure in 1996, he was appointed as the executive officer, NNS Enyimiri.

In 1997, he became the commanding officer of the Nigerian Navy Ship Ofiom, and in 1998 he commanded the  ship NNS Ambe in operation Liberty (ECOMOG), where he obtained the Command at Sea Badge.
In 2001, he became the Deputy Director Attaché Management, Defence Intelligence Agency and the Naval Provost Marshal, Naval Headquarters. 
In 2002, he was appointed as the defence adviser to the Nigerian Embassy Cameroun. He served in this capacity for 4 years until the end of his tenure in 2006.
In December 2006, he was appointed as  chief staff officer at the Sea Training Command, and later became the commandant officer of the Defence Intelligence School (DIS) Abuja in June 2007. Thereafter, he was appointed as Nigerian Navy secretary and while serving in this capacity, he was promoted to rear admiral.
In 2010 he became the flag officer commanding, Eastern Naval Command, coordinating a joint operation involving the 3 services around the Gulf of Guinea, NEMO. He also, he coordinated a combined Exercise, called OBANGAME EXPRESS 2012, involving 11 countries including Germany and United Kingdom.
In January 2014, he took over from Vice Admiral Dele Joseph Ezeoba as the Chief of Naval Staff, and on 5 February 2014, he was promoted to the rank of vice admiral by Goodluck Ebele Jonathan, the President of the Federal Republic of Nigeria.

Awards and decorations
He is a recipient of several awards and decorations. Among them are:
 Best Naval Cadet (1982), awarded by the Nigerian Navy
 Passed Staff College Dagger (psc+), awarded by the Nigerian Navy
 Forces Service Star (FSS), awarded by the Nigerian Navy 
 Distinguish Service Star (DSS), awarded by the Nigerian Navy
 Meritorious Service Star (MSS), awarded by the Nigerian Navy 
 General Service Star (GSS) awarded by the Nigerian Navy
 Command at Sea Badge awarded by the Nigerian Navy. 
 Admiralty Medal, awarded by the Nigerian Navy.

See also
Nigerian Navy

References

1959 births
Living people
Nigerian Navy officers
Nigerian military personnel
Nigerian Navy admirals
People from Kogi State
Chiefs of Naval Staff (Nigeria)